William J. Powell (November 22, 1916December 31, 2009) was an American businessman, entrepreneur, and pioneering golf course owner who designed the Clearview Golf Club, the first integrated golf course, as well as the first to cater to African-American golfers. He was also the first African American to design, construct and own a professional golf course in the United States. Powell was fond of saying "The only color that matters is the color of the greens".

Biography

Powell was the grandson of Alabama slaves and was born in Greenville, Alabama. During his youth, Powell moved with his family to Minerva, Ohio. In high school there, he played golf and football. Later, at the state's historically African-American Wilberforce University, he played on the golf team.

After serving in the United States Army Air Forces in World War II in England, he returned to the Canton, Ohio-area near Minerva in 1946, and began work first as a janitor and later as a security guard for the Timken bearing and steel company. Due to racial segregation, he was banned from all-white public golf courses and was rejected for a bank loan to try to build his own. With financing from two African-American doctors and a loan from his brother, Powell bought a  dairy farm in East Canton, Ohio, and with his wife, Marcella, did most of the landscaping by hand. Two years later, in 1948, he opened the integrated Clearview Golf Club. In 1978, he expanded the course to 18 holes and earned a national-historic-site designation in 2001.
 
As of the 2000s (decade), Clearview was the only course in the United States designed, constructed, owned and operated by an African American.

Powell died in Canton, Ohio, on New Year's Eve, 2009, following complications from a stroke.

Awards and honors

* 1996 - Powell was inducted into the National Black Golf Hall of Fame. He also received honorary Doctor of Humane Letters degrees from his alma mater, and from Baldwin-Wallace College in Berea, Ohio.

* 2001 - The United States Department of the Interior added Clearview Golf Course to the National Register of Historic Places.

* 2009 - Powell was named the recipient of the 2009 PGA Distinguished Service Award by the Professional Golfers' Association of America and was honored in conjunction with the 91st PGA Championship.

* 2019 - The Powell family was named the recipient of the 2019 Old Tom Morris Award by the Golf Course Superintendents Association of America and was honored at the 2019 Golf Industry Show.

Family info and personal
Powell's daughter, Renee Powell, who is a veteran professional golfer herself, was the second black golfer to play on the LPGA Tour, after golfer and tennis star Althea Gibson. Now serving as Clearview's Head Golf Professional, Renee, who was taught to play golf at a young age by her father, is also known as one of the top golf instructors in the U.S. His son, Lawrence "Larry" Powell, presently serves as Clearview's Course Superintendent. His work has been recognized by both NASA and the Golf Course Superintendents Association of America.

See also 

Military history of African Americans

References

Sports Illustrated January 11, 2010

External links
 Clearview Golf Course official website
 "After Battling Racism, Veteran Found Peace on His Golf Course" The New York Times, August 8, 2009
 African American Golf Digest
 "William J. Powell receives '09 PGA Distinguished Service Award", WorldGolf.com
  "African-American Golf Pioneer Bill Powell Dies at 93,"  New York Times, January 1, 2010

African-American people
Golf course architects
20th-century American businesspeople
Golf in the United States
United States Army Air Forces soldiers
United States Army personnel of World War II
People from Greenville, Alabama
People from Minerva, Ohio
Military personnel from Alabama
Wilberforce University alumni
Golfers from Alabama
Golfers from Ohio
1916 births
2009 deaths
People from East Canton, Ohio
20th-century African-American sportspeople